Eric Weinberg (born 1959/1960) is an American television producer and screenwriter best known for his work on the television series Scrubs.

Biography
Weinberg is a graduate of the Wharton School of the University of Pennsylvania. After school, he worked in finance at the investment bank Oppenheimer & Co. In the mid-1990s, he earned his first writing credits.

Weinberg has served as co-executive producer on Scrubs for over a hundred episodes since 2002, and is credited as supervising producer and writer for an additional twenty episodes since the show's debut in 2001. Also notably, he was both the writer and executive producer of 2005 made-for-television movie Confessions of a Dog, and has both produced and written episodes for the series Graves, Californication and Veronica's Closet. His other credits including writing for the series American Dad, Wilfred, Party Girl, Politically Incorrect and Too Something.

He has been nominated for five Primetime Emmy Awards, two for the crew of Scrubs, and three for Politically Incorrect, which was also nominated for a WGA Award.

Personal life and allegations of sexual assault
On July 14, 2022, Weinberg was arrested by the Los Angeles Police Department on multiple charges of sexual assault between 2012 and 2019. He is being held on bail of $3.225 million.

References

External links

American television producers
American television writers
American male screenwriters
Year of birth missing (living people)
Living people
American male television writers
Wharton School of the University of Pennsylvania alumni

People charged with sex crimes